Nau Paraone Kawiti Puriri (7 March 1924 – 1 September 1979) was a New Zealand  land title officer, maori welfare worker. Of Māori descent, he identified with the Ngāpuhi, Ngati Hine (Northland) and Ngāti Kahu o Torongare iwi. He was born in Ngararatunua, Northland, New Zealand in 1924.

References

1924 births
1979 deaths
New Zealand Māori public servants
Ngāpuhi people
Ngāti Kahu people